The 2018 Dutch Open (officially known as the Yonex Dutch Open 2018 for sponsorship reasons) was a badminton tournament which took place from 9 to 14 October 2018 at Topsportcentrum in Almere, Netherlands, and had a total purse of $75,000.

Tournament
The 2018 Dutch Open was the ninth Super 100 tournament of the 2018 BWF World Tour and also part of the Dutch Open championships, which had been held since 1932. This tournament was organised by Badminton Nederland and sanctioned by the BWF.

Venue
This international tournament was held at Topsportscentrum in Almere, Flevoland, Netherlands.

Point distribution
Below is the point distribution table for each phase of the tournament based on the BWF points system for the BWF Tour Super 100 event.

Prize money
The total prize money for this tournament was US$75,000. Distribution of prize money was in accordance with BWF regulations.

Men's singles

Seeds

 Mark Caljouw (semi-finals)
 Rajiv Ouseph (withdrew)
 Jan Ø. Jørgensen (withdrew)
 Ygor Coelho de Oliveira (second round)
 Lucas Corvée (third round)
 Misha Zilberman (second round)
 Pablo Abián (third round)
 Parupalli Kashyap (quarter-finals)

Finals

Top half

Section 1

Section 2

Bottom half

Section 3

Section 4

Women's singles

Seeds

 Mia Blichfeldt (champion)
 Beatriz Corrales (first round)
 Rachel Honderich (semi-finals)
 Neslihan Yiğit (quarter-finals)
 Chloe Birch (quarter-finals)
 Yvonne Li (withdrew)
 Mette Poulsen (withdrew)
 Sabrina Jaquet (quarter-finals)

Finals

Top half

Section 1

Section 2

Bottom half

Section 3

Section 4

Men's doubles

Seeds

 Berry Angriawan / Hardianto (quarter-finals)
 Wahyu Nayaka / Ade Yusuf (champions)
 Marcus Ellis / Chris Langridge (second round)
 Jones Ralfy Jansen / Josche Zurwonne (semi-finals)
 Jelle Maas / Robin Tabeling (final)
 Ben Lane / Sean Vendy (second round)
 Arjun M.R. / Ramchandran Shlok (quarter-finals)
 Jacco Arends / Ruben Jille (quarter-finals)

Finals

Top half

Section 1

Section 2

Bottom half

Section 3

Section 4

Women's doubles

Seeds

 Gabriela Stoeva / Stefani Stoeva (champions)
 Maiken Fruergaard / Sara Thygesen (semi-finals)
 Selena Piek / Cheryl Seinen (final)
 Émilie Lefel / Anne Tran (quarter-finals)
 Rachel Honderich / Kristen Tsai (quarter-finals)
 Nami Matsuyama / Chiharu Shida (quarter-finals)
 Lim Chiew Sien / Tan Sueh Jeou (first round)
 Delphine Delrue / Léa Palermo (first round)

Finals

Top half

Section 1

Section 2

Bottom half

Section 3

Section 4

Mixed doubles

Seeds

 Marcus Ellis / Lauren Smith (champions)
 Niclas Nøhr / Sara Thygesen (second round)
 Jacco Arends / Selena Piek (semi-finals)
 Ben Lane / Jessica Pugh (quarter-finals)
 Ronan Labar / Audrey Fontaine (first round)
 Mikkel Mikkelsen / Mai Surrow (quarter-finals)
 Robin Tabeling / Cheryl Seinen (quarter-finals)
 Rohan Kapoor / Kuhoo Garg (first round)

Finals

Top half

Section 1

Section 2

Bottom half

Section 3

Section 4

References

External links
 Tournament Link

Dutch Open (badminton)
Dutch Open (badminton)
Dutch Open
Dutch Open (badminton)
Sports competitions in Almere